White Ring is an American witch house musical group, formed in 2009 in New York City by Bryan Kurkimilis and Kendra Malia.

History
Founding members Bryan Kurkimilis and Kendra Malia met each other through the social networking website MySpace in 2006. Around this time Malia would suggest they should work together on music, and from that point began working together on songs for the next three years. In 2009, Kurkimilis moved from New Orleans to New York to pursue White Ring full-time with Malia. The two were later joined by co-vocalist Adina Viarengo in 2016. The current touring line-up consists of Kurimilis and Viarengo.

The band's debut release was a split 7-inch single with fellow founding witch house artist oOoOO. The single, titled Roses / Seaww, was released in March 2010. In 2011 they released their debut EP Black Earth That Made Me (Disaro Records) and the DJ mix 	
Chaind Vol. 1 (Pendu Sound Recordings); after that they went on seven year-long hiatus. In July 2018, the band made a comeback and released their debut studio album, Gate of Grief. The album was originally scheduled to be released on June 22, but was eventually delayed and released on July 27. The album was in the works for eight years, but was put off due to Malia's health issues.

In late 2019 it was confirmed that Kendra Malia had died on October 25, she was 37 years old.

Discography

Studio albums

Extended plays

Singles

References

External links
 
 

American electronic music groups
Rocket Girl artists